Besançon Hugues (b. 1487 - d. 1532) was a member of the Grand Council of Geneva and participated in the rebellion against the rule of the Savoy dynasty, which led to the independence of Geneva in 1526.

He was a supporter of Philibert Berthelier and the pro-independence faction in the Grand Council of Geneva. Following the invasion of Geneva by Savoy forces in September 1525, fled to Fribourg, from which he continued the rebellion which proves successful the following year. Following the overthrow of Savoy rule over Geneva, strove to protect the Catholic Church in Geneva and to prevent the spread of the Protestant reformation in his city.

Following the attainment of independence in 1526, supported the holding of fair trial proceedings to the supporters of the Savoy dynasty within Geneva. From about 1527 onward, began to sympathize with the Protestant faction in Geneva, but remained loyal to the Catholic church and the bishop of Geneva. On 20 February 1532 he resigned his seat at the Grand Council of Geneva and died of an illness soon thereafter. Following his resignation, he made plans to restore the authority of the Catholic bishop of Geneva Pierre de la Baume, but died without any success.

His brother Guillaume Hugues was also a Grand Council member, but was more positive towards the Protestants.

When resigning his posts in 1532, he cited family problems as the reason for this, but some scholars have suggested the real reason being his inability to cooperate with Protestants.

See also
Huguenots#Etymology

Notes

1487 births
1532 deaths
16th-century people from the Republic of Geneva
History of Geneva